The 2005 Big 12 Conference women's soccer tournament was the postseason women's soccer tournament for the Big 12 Conference held from November 2 to 6, 2005. The 7-match tournament was held at the Blossom Athletic Center in San Antonio, TX with a combined attendance of 6,768. The 8-team single-elimination tournament consisted of three rounds based on seeding from regular season conference play. The Texas A&M Aggies defeated the Colorado Buffaloes in the championship match to win their 4th conference tournament.

Regular season standings
Source:

Bracket

Awards

Most valuable player
Source:
Offensive MVP – Paige Carmichael – Texas A&M
Defensive MVP – Ashlee Pistorius – Texas A&M

All-Tournament team

References 

 
Big 12 Conference Women's Soccer Tournament